Jesper Asholt (born 11 May 1960 in Silkeborg) is a Danish actor. He has performed in more than fifty films since 1992.

Selected filmography

Awards 
 2000: Bodil Award for Best Actress in a Supporting Role for his role of Rud in Mifune
 2008: Bodil Award for Best Actor in a Leading Role for The Art of Crying

References

Sources

External links 
 
 Jesper Asholt at Den Danske Film Database (in Danish)

1960 births
Best Actor Bodil Award winners
Best Supporting Actor Bodil Award winners
Danish male film actors
Living people
People from Silkeborg